Milton is an English surname. Notable people with the surname include:

Aaron Milton, Canadian football player
Anne Milton, United Kingdom Member of Parliament
Arthur Milton, English cricketer and footballer
Berth Milton Sr., Swedish pornographer
Berth Milton Jr., Swedish pornographer
Brian Milton, ultralight aircraft pilot
CB Milton, pop singer
Eric Milton, Major League Baseball player
Giles Milton, British journalist and writer
Joe Milton (born 2000), American football player
John Milton, English poet
John Milton (composer), father of the poet John Milton
John Milton (Florida politician), American politician who was the fifth governor of Florida
John Milton (Georgia politician), the Secretary of State of Georgia from 1777 to 1799
John Milton Niles, U.S. editor and political figure from Connecticut
John Gerald Milton, Democratic United States Senator from New Jersey
Keenan Milton, a professional skateboarder who died in 2001
Lance Milton, Canadian football player
McKenzie Milton (born 1997), American football player
Michael A. Milton, American theologian
Michael Milton (cricketer), English cricketer
Michael Milton (skier), Australian Winter Paralympic skier and cyclist
Peter Milton, American artist
Shake Milton, American basketball player
Tommy Milton, American race car driver
Trevor Milton (born 1981/1982), American billionaire, CEO and co-founder of Nikola Motor Company
William Hall Milton, U.S. Senator from Florida
William Henry Milton, South African cricket player

English-language surnames

de:Milton
fr:Milton
pt:Milton
zh:米尔顿